Zanzibar is an autonomous part of Tanzania.

Zanzibar may also refer to:

Geography
All related to the insular autonomous region of Tanzania are:
 Unguja, also referred to as "Zanzibar Island" or simply "Zanzibar", one of the two major islands of Zanzibar
 Zanzibar City, the capital of the Zanzibar
 Zanzibar Archipelago, an island group off the coast of East Africa consisting of the islands of Zanzibar plus Mafia Island
 Sultanate of Zanzibar, a country between 1856 and 1964 (from 1890 onward a protectorate of the United Kingdom), which comprised the Zanzibar Archipelago and parts of the east coast of what is today Tanzania
 People's Republic of Zanzibar, a short-lived state consisting of the islands of the Zanzibar, which was proclaimed and then merged into the newly formed Tanzania in 1964

Music
 "Zanzibar" (Billy Joel song), from 52nd Street (1978)
 "Zanzibar", a song by Gordon Haskell
 "Zanzibar", a song by Suburban Legends on the album Rump Shaker
 "Zanzibar", a song by Lizzy Borden on the album Deal with the Devil
 "Zanzibar", a song by Edu Lobo
 "Zanzibar", a song by Bill Harley
 "Zanzibar", a song by Arabesque

Entertainment
 Zanzibar (film), a 1940 American film
 Zanzibar (G.I. Joe), a fictional modern-day pirate character in the G.I. Joe universe, member of the Dreadnoks
 "Zanzibar" (Inside No. 9), series 4 episode 1 (2018)
 Zanzibarland, a fictional country in the video game Metal Gear 2: Solid Snake
 An episode of Rocko's Modern Life

Transportation and vehicles
, a British frigate in the commission in the Royal Navy from 1944 to 1946
 45638 Zanzibar, a British LMS Jubilee Class locomotive
 Zanzibar, a fictional ship in The Wreck of the Zanzibar by Michael Morpurgo

Other
 Zanzibar Tavern, an adult entertainment nightclub in Toronto, Canada
 Zanzibar, a brand of kreteks from Dhanraj International
Club Zanzibar

See also

 United Republic of Tanganyika and Zanzibar, predecessor of Tanzania
 
 Zanabazar, Mongolian religious leader and polymath
 Zinjibar, capital of the Abyan Governorate in Yemen whose name has the same origin as Zanzibar
Zingiber, the genus of plants that are the source of ginger
 Tanzania (disambiguation)